The  is a skyscraper located in the Sendagaya district of Shibuya, Tokyo, Japan.

Function
The NTT Docomo Yoyogi Building is owned by the NTT Docomo group. Despite the building's name, it is not the head office for the company, whose headquarters are located in the top floors of the Sannō Park Tower. The building houses some offices, but is mainly used to house technical equipment (switching equipment, etc.) for the company's cellular telephone service.

To commemorate NTT Docomo's 10th anniversary, a 15-meter-diameter clock was put into operation in November 2002.

Solar energy is partially used to power the building. A garbage separation system employed within the office helps to reduce waste and increase the recycling rate.  The waste water is recycled for reuse, and rainwater is reused for the building's toilets.

Images

See also
 Empire State Building
List of tallest buildings and structures in the world
List of tallest buildings and structures in Japan

References

External links 

Skyscraper office buildings in Tokyo
Buildings and structures in Shibuya
Office buildings completed in 2000
Clock towers
NTT Docomo
2000 establishments in Japan